Saurita temenus is a moth in the subfamily Arctiinae. It was described by Stoll in 1782. It is found in Suriname and the Amazon region.

References

Moths described in 1782
Saurita